The 1907 New Hampshire football team was an American football team that represented New Hampshire College of Agriculture and the Mechanic Arts during the 1907 college football season—the school became the University of New Hampshire in 1923.  Under second-year head coach Edward Herr, the team finished with a record of 1–5–2.

Schedule
Scoring during this era awarded five points for a touchdown, one point for a conversion kick (extra point), and four points for a field goal.  Teams played in the one-platoon system, and games were played in two halves rather than four quarters.

The September 21 game was the first meeting between the New Hampshire and Norwich football programs.

New Hampshire's second team (reserves) defeated Berwick Academy in Berwick, Maine, 5–4.

Roster
A team roster published early in the season had 32 names; after the season, 13 players plus the student team manager were awarded varsity letters:

In December 1908, Carl Chase and another student drowned while canoeing in the nearby Great Bay. Edson D. Sanborn later coached the Student Army Training Corps (SATC) personnel of the 1918 New Hampshire football team that competed in place of the varsity.

Notes

Further reading

References

New Hampshire
New Hampshire Wildcats football seasons
New Hampshire football